Brad G. Stanius (March 14, 1946 – October 7, 2014) was an American pharmacist and politician.

From White Bear Lake, Minnesota, Stanius received his bachelor's degree from the University of Minnesota School of Pharmacy. He was a pharmacist. He served on the White Bear Lake City Council and was mayor of the city. From 1985 to 1994, Stanius served in the Minnesota House of Representatives. He was a Republican.

Notes

1946 births
2014 deaths
People from White Bear Lake, Minnesota
University of Minnesota College of Pharmacy alumni
Businesspeople from Minnesota
Minnesota city council members
Mayors of places in Minnesota
Republican Party members of the Minnesota House of Representatives
20th-century American businesspeople